Danny Adcock (born 29 June 1948) is an Australian actor, known for his work in television and theatre.

His television acting roles include 7 different roles in Crawford Production series Matlock Police as the killer of Michael Pate's character, Division 4, Homicide,  

Patrol Boat, Sons and Daughters as Joe Parker, Prisoner as Deputy Governor Geoff Carlson of fictional prison Woodridge, A Country Practice, E Street, Fire as "Nugget", Blue Heelers, All Saints, Stingers, and Home and Away as Bishop Pitt. Long Lost Family 2 more Season between 2014 And 2015

He was a regular cast member of short-lived soap opera Arcade (1980) as Duncan Adams. In Farscape he played T'raltixx in the second-season episode "Crackers Don't Matter", and Co-Kura Strappa, a recurring character throughout the third season.

His first film role was in The Cars That Ate Paris. He played a small part in the films Quigley Down Under starring Tom Selleck, and The Earthling with William Holden. He played Terry "Mr Asia" Clark in the film Greed.

Theatre

In 1998 Adcock acted in the O'Punksky's production of Brian Friel's the Faith Healer.

In 2008 Adcock acted in The Pig Iron People Sydney Theatre Company written by John Doyle.

In 2009, Adcock acted in the Sydney Theatre Company production of The Removalists,

In 2012 Danny Adcock played the lead role, Pablo Picasso in the Ensemble Theatre's production A Picasso.

Danny Adcock appeared in two shows for the Kirribilli Pub Theatre between 1978 - 88 (http://kirribillipubtheatre.tripod.com). These included "The 1984 Show", "The Western Show" and the remount of  "The Vampire Show" performed at the Bronte Inn.

Filmography

External links
 

1948 births
Living people
Australian male television actors
Male actors from Sydney